José Arturo López Cándido (born 20 December 1952) is a Mexican politician affiliated with the National Regeneration Movement (formerly from the Labor Party. He currently serves as Deputy of the LXII Legislature of the Mexican Congress representing the Federal District.

References

1952 births
Living people
People from Mexico City
Labor Party (Mexico) politicians
Morena (political party) politicians
21st-century Mexican politicians
Deputies of the LXII Legislature of Mexico
Members of the Chamber of Deputies (Mexico) for Mexico City